The Frankfort OQ-16, also known as the TD3D, was a target drone designed by the Frankfort Sailplane Company for use by the United States Army Air Forces and United States Navy.

The OQ-16 was developed under a contract for a radio-controlled target drone awarded in early 1945. Fifteen aircraft were ordered by the USAAF; later in the year the contract was transferred to the United States Navy, which assigned the designation TD3D-1 to the type. However, the contract was cancelled before any of the aircraft were built.

Specifications

See also

References

OQ-016
Single-engined tractor aircraft
Monoplanes
Cancelled military aircraft projects of the United States
Target drones